is a Japanese politician of the New Komeito Party, a member of the House of Representatives in the Diet (national legislature). A native of Yokohama, Kanagawa and graduate of the University of Tokyo, he worked at the Ministry of Agriculture, Forestry and Fisheries from 1981 to 1993. He was elected to the House of Representatives for the first time in 1993.

References

External links 
 Official website in Japanese.

1958 births
Living people
People from Yokohama
University of Tokyo alumni
Members of the House of Representatives (Japan)
New Komeito politicians
21st-century Japanese politicians